Jeffreys is a surname, which may refer to:

People: (See also the common variants Jeffries and Jefferies)

 Alec Jeffreys (born 1950), British biologist and discoverer of DNA fingerprinting
 Anne Jeffreys (1923–2017), American actress and singer
 Arthur Frederick Jeffreys (1848–1906), British politician
 Bertha Jeffreys (1903–1999), British physicist a.k.a. Bertha Swirles
 Charles Jeffreys (1877 – unknown), South African shooter
 Edmund Frederick Jeffreys (1846–1925), British Royal Navy admiral
 Elizabeth Jeffreys (born 1941), British Byzantinist
 Ellen Penelope Jeffreys (1827–1904), New Zealand artist
 Garland Jeffreys (born 1943), American musician
 George Jeffreys (composer) (c. 1610 – 1685), composer and organist to Charles I
 George Jeffreys, 1st Baron Jeffreys (1645–1689), British jurist & politician
 George Jeffreys, 1st Baron Jeffreys (British Army officer) (1878–1960), British soldier & politician
 George Jeffreys (pastor) (1889–1962), British religious leader
 Gina Jeffreys (born 1968), Australian singer
 Harold Jeffreys (1891–1989), British mathematician, statistician, geophysicist, and astronomer
 J. G. Jeffreys (born 1893), Australian-born educator
 John Gwyn Jeffreys (1809–1885), British malacologist
 John R. F. Jeffreys (1918–1944), British mathematician
 Julius Jeffreys (1800–1877), British physician
 Paul Jeffreys (1952–1988), English rock musician and bassist
 Rhodri Jeffreys-Jones (born 1942), British historian
 Robin Jeffreys (1890–1963), British Olympic fencer
 Sheila Jeffreys (born 1948), British-born political scientist, academic, & activist
 Stephen Jeffreys (1950–2018), British playwright

Other:
 Baron Jeffreys, a title in the English and UK peerages

See also
 Jeffreys prior 
 Jefferies (disambiguation)
 Jeffrey (disambiguation)
 Jefferys

English-language surnames
Patronymic surnames
Surnames from given names